The Housekeeper's Daughter is a 1939 comedy film directed and produced by Hal Roach. The film stars Joan Bennett,  Adolphe Menjou and John Hubbard. The screenplay was written by Rian James, Gordon Douglas, Jack Jevne and Claude Martin, based on a novel by Donald Henderson Clarke.

It was the film debut of Victor Mature.

Plot
Hilda is fed up with her life as a gun moll to gangster Floyd and visits her mother, housekeeper for the cultured Randall family.  Professor Randall and his wife go on vacation, leaving behind sheltered son Robert to embark upon a career as a reporter at Hilda's urging. Soon after, Benny, a feeble-minded flower vendor, follows showgirl Gladys Fontaine when Floyd forces her to join him on his houseboat to take Hilda's place.

Fearing for Gladys' safety, Benny poisons a cup of coffee intended for the gangster, but Gladys drinks it instead. Benny watches in horror as Floyd tosses the dead girl's body into the river.  The next morning, Robert reads about Gladys' death and attaches himself to hard-drinking, womanizing ace crime reporter Deakon Maxwell and his photographer, Ed O'Malley.

The trio go to police headquarters, where every bum on the waterfront at the time of the murder has been rounded up for questioning. Benny confesses to accidentally killing Gladys but is ridiculed and not believed. Robert takes pity on the little man and befriends him.  After a night of drinking with Deakon and Ed at his expense, and learning from Benny that Gladys was thrown from the houseboat, the drunken Robert calls his editor and reports the details.

Waking up the next morning with no memory of the evening's events, Robert finds that his story has scooped the other newspapers and that he is being hailed as a true newspaperman. Robert's byline story leads Floyd to believe that the reporter has the goods on him, and he orders him eliminated.

Floyd's gang converges on the Randall house, where he finds and menaces Hilda. Benny makes more of his fatal coffee to protect her. Deakon and Ed are drunkenly shooting fireworks from the roof and, believing them to be gun shots, the gangsters open fire.  As the mobsters begin dropping dead from Benny's poisoned coffee, the police come to the rescue and Robert wins the affections of Hilda.

Cast

Production
The film was based on a novel published in 1938. The New York Times said it had a "good mystery" and "delightful love story."
Film rights were bought by Hal Roach. Sigrid Gurie was discussed as a possible lead. In December Jack Jevne was reportedly working on the script.

Roach tried to get Lee Tracy in the film. The role eventually went to Adolphe Menjou and Joan Bennett was given the female lead.

By May Rian James was working on the script.

It was the first of a five-picture deal between Hal Roach and United Artists.

In June it was announced Roach would direct and Joan Bennett and Peggy Wood would star.

Victor Mature was cast after being spotted in a stage play, To Quito and Back. He impressed Hal Roach so much that Roach cast Mature in the lead for One Million Years BC.

Reception
The Los Angeles Times said it "bears the earmarks of a flicker from the early 1920s. Its characters are two dimensional its continuity hit and miss and its action fast and foolish."

The film initially did not perform well at the box office. Roach and United Artists launched a new campaign which played up the more salacious aspects of the story, such as using ad lines like "the housekeeper's daughter did things she hadn't oughter." This approach annoyed Bennett who threatened to sue. Roach refused so Bennett wrote to 3,000 women's clubs arguing she had been maligned and asking them to boycott the film. The resulting publicity helped make the film a box office success.

In 1957 it was announced Hal Roach, Jr. would remake the film as a musical. However this never happened.

References

External links
 
 
 
 

1939 films
American black-and-white films
Films directed by Hal Roach
1939 comedy films
American comedy films
Films based on American novels
1930s American films